The SL18 (short for Sporvogn Ledd, commissioned in 2018) is a series of 87 low-floor, articulated trams currently being phased-in on the Oslo Tramway network. They will continue to be phased-in until 2024, when the last SL79s and SL95s were replaced. They were purchased from the Spanish tram manufacturer, CAF. The first one was shipped and unveiled at Grefsen depot in 2020, and regular operation begun in 2022. The entire purchase has a price of 4.2 billion krones. There is also a possibility of acquiring another 60 more trams from CAF.

History 
By 2009, it was recognised that the city of Oslo needed new trams and that the rail infrastructure needed to be upgraded. In 2013, the City Council of Oslo initiated the tram program. The responsabilty of procurement was transferred to Sporveien in August 2015. In December 2015, the Council approved the procurement of 87 new trams. Also in December 2015, the pre-qualification of suppliers begin and the potential suppliers were announced in March 2016. The pre-qualification stage ended with six suppliers being invited tenders. Including the winner, there were five other selections.

 Alstom (Alstom Transport)
 Bombardier (Bombardier Transportation)
 Skoda (Skoda Transportation)
 Stadler Pankow GmBh
 Siemens AG and Siemens AS

On the 30th of March 2017, the submit deadline passed and the evaluation process begun. A year later, on the 18th June 2018, Sporveien awarded a contract to CAF. On the 28th of August, 2019, a full-scale model of the new tram was unveiled at Rådhusplassen (City Hall Square).

In 2020, after the outbreak of COVID-19, the production of trams in Spain was temporarily halted. Nonetheless, in October 2020, the first tram arrived in Oslo and it was unveiled at Grefsen Depot. There was a testing period on Line 13 between Skøyen and Bråten in early 2022, before being put to use on Line 17 and Line 18, between Rikshospitalet and Grefsen station, starting from April 2022.

Fremtidens Byreise program 
The Fremtidens Byreise program was initiated as part of the tram program in 2013. In 2015, the City Council approved the procurement of new trams and along with it, the modernization of the current system's infrastructure. This involved the upgrading of Oslo's streets and tracks, and multiple old water and wastewater pipes were to be replaced.The first building project begun in 2014, which was the upgrading and renovating Prinsens gate. The tracks were demolished and replaced in a two-way system. About 30 renovation projects followed suit across Oslo in the late 2010s. This unfortunately led to system closures, such as the one on the Kjelsås Line (which lasted approximately 2 years). According to the official website, one of their aims was to satisfy the requirements of universal design, making it easier for everyone to take the tram. One of their predictions, is that the amount of journeys taken by passengers taking the tram will double from 51 million to 100 million by 2030.

Specifications 
The six-axle, five-segmented tram can accommodate a maximum of 220 passengers. They are significantly lighter than the SL95s, weighing at just 43 tons, compared to the 65 tons of the SL95s. The height is 3.65 metres. The SL18 is a form of the Urbos 100 stock (this rolling-stock is also used in many other European cities). The exterior is in a blue colour that matches the previous stock.      

The tram is also entirely (100%) low-floor making it accessible to wheelchair users. The interior is fitted with a passenger information system to display the next tram stop, instead of the dot-matrix displays used on the former stock. There are also rectangular displays to show advertisements and the current location of the tram. The SL18 is bi-directional, so there is no need to use a balloon loop to turn around. Therefore, there are two driver cabs, one at each end of the tram. They are also infitted with USB-charging slots. There are multiple ticket validators aboard the tram. There are six doors on one side, so there are there are twelve in total. They also make a beeping noise whenever they open and close. Unfortunately, this has led to complaints from people stating that the noise level is too high.

There are 56 seats in total, arranged in a transverse seating pattern. This is however less than the previous SL95 trams, which had 88 seats. According to Jan Rustad, communications adviser of Sporveien, the reason for the reduced seating capacity is to make it more accessible for stroller and wheelchair users. There are no stairs anywhere on the tram.

Sporveien has also developed a cloud-based platform than runs in Amazon Web Services (AWS), which communicates with the SL18 trams over 4G/5G. The technical department (who are stationed in the depots) have access to this system. The trams also have GPS that transmits its location to the digital platform two times per second.

Operation 

At the moment, SL18 trams have begun operating on routes 17 and 18. However, they have not completely replaced the SL95 on those routes, but instead at the moment, supplement alongside them. Therefore, they currently serve the Ullevål Hageby Line, the Grünerløkka–Torshov Line and the Sinsen Line. During the trial period in early 2022, the SL18 ran on sections of Line 13 (such as the Skøyen Line, the Bjørvika Line and the Ekeberg Line.) There was also a short trial period on Line 12 and 19 in June 2022.

Line 17 and 18 need a minimum of 19 trams to operate during the day, in order to maintain a 10-minute frequency. After this has been achieved, there are plans to start phasing them in on Line 12 and 19.  According to City Councilor Raymond Johansen, the trams should be serving the city of Oslo for at least 25 or more years.

Notes

See also 

 SL79
 SL95
 CAF Urbos
 Trams in Oslo

External links 

 Om Sporveien Trikken - Sporveien AS
 Forside - Fremtidens Byreise
 Ruter AS
 CW.no (Oslos nye slothet skal være helt på nett)
 Teknisk Ukeblad (Med 12.000 parametere fra et utall sensorer er den nye Oslo-trikken en av verdens mest avanserte)

References 

Oslo Tramway stock
CAF multiple units
750 V DC multiple units